Todd Run is a  long 1st order tributary to Middle Wheeling Creek in Ohio County, West Virginia.

Course 
Todd Run rises about 1.5 miles southwest of West Alexander, Pennsylvania and then flows south-southeast to join Middle Wheeling Creek about 2.5 miles northeast of Camp Giscowhego.

Watershed 
Todd Run drains  of area, receives about 41.0 in/year of precipitation, has a wetness index of 318.46, and is about 56% forested.

See also 
 List of rivers of West Virginia

References 

Rivers of Ohio County, West Virginia
Rivers of West Virginia